The 1954 All-Ireland Senior Football Championship Final was the 67th All-Ireland Final and the deciding match of the 1954 All-Ireland Senior Football Championship, an inter-county Gaelic football tournament for the top teams in Ireland.

Meath won by six points with a goal by Tom Moriarty.

References

All-Ireland Senior Football Championship Finals
All-Ireland Senior Football Championship Final, 1954
All-Ireland Senior Football Championship Finals
All-Ireland Senior Football Championship Finals
Kerry county football team matches
Meath county football team matches